Said Akbar Khan Babrakzai or Said Akbar Khan (1921 or 1922 – 16 October 1951) was an Afghan tribesman who assassinated the first Prime Minister and a leading founding father of Pakistan, Liaquat Ali Khan, at Company Bagh in Rawalpindi on 16 October 1951. Belonging to the Pashtun Babrakzai clan of Afghanistan, he fought against the Afghan government during the Tribal revolts.

Personal life
Said Akbar was born in 1921 or 1922 in Khost, Afghanistan. He was the son of Babrak Khan, a Zadran chieftain. When his father died, Said's brother, Mazrak became the new chief. Mazrak would fight against the Afghan government during the Afghan tribal revolts of 1944–1947 to support the restoration of King Amanullah Khan. Said was a minor leader in these revolts, fighting for Mazrak.

Said had two sons, including Dilawar Khan. His wife was Musammat Malmal Bibi.

Assassination of Liaqat Ali Khan
On October 16, 1951, during a public meeting, Said Akbar Khan shot the Prime Minister of Pakistan Liaquat Ali Khan twice in a park in Rawalpindi, Punjab, Pakistan. The assassin was fatally shot by police officers seconds later. Liaquat was rushed to a hospital where he passed away.

Said Akbar's motives to assassinate Liaqat Ali Khan remain unclear as he was shot dead on the spot.

However, there are many conspiracy theories regarding the assassination of Liaqat Ali Khan which claim that Liaqat was assassinated on the behest of foreign powers. Some say it was a reaction from the Soviet Union for his anti-communist and pro-western policies, while others blame the USA for ordering the killing due to Khan's alleged non-cooperation on the Iranian issue and an alleged demand for the US to vacate its airbases in Pakistan.

The Afghan government has, however, denied any role in the assassination of Liaqat and also disowned the act of Said Akbar Babrakzai.

Family

External links 
 The Assassination of the Prime Minister Liaquat Ali Khan: The Fateful Journey

References

1920s births
1951 deaths
Pashtun people
Political history of Pakistan
Liaquat Ali Khan
People shot dead by law enforcement officers in Pakistan
Assassins of heads of government
People from Khost
Year of birth uncertain